This is a list of Native American leaders who participated in the American Indian Wars, which occurred throughout the early 17th century until the early 20th century. This list includes both chiefs and others.

References

 
Indian Wars
Native Americans